The Santa Claus Bank Robbery occurred on December 23, 1927, in the Central Texas town of Cisco.  Marshall Ratliff, dressed as Santa Claus, along with Henry Helms and Robert Hill, all ex-cons, and Louis Davis, a relative of Helms, held up the First National Bank in Cisco. The robbery is one of Texas' most infamous crimes, having invoked the largest manhunt ever seen in the state. Eyewitness Boyce House wrote that this was "the most spectacular crime in the history of the Southwest ... surpassing any in which Billy the Kid or the James boys had ever figured."

Background

Marshall Ratliff was an ex-con who had lived in Cisco before being tracked down and imprisoned for a bank robbery in Valera, Texas, by Cisco Chief of Police, G.E. "Bit" Bedford. Though Ratliff was given a long prison sentence, he had been paroled just before the infamous bank robbery. He initially planned to rob the Cisco bank with his brother, Lee, but Lee had been arrested again. Ratliff pulled in Helms and Hill, whom he knew from Huntsville, and a fourth man who was good with safes.

Robbery

Planning
As they planned the crime in Wichita Falls, the safe-cracker came down with the flu, and the trio pulled in Davis, a relative of Helms and a family man in need, promising a large return for his participation. During this period in Texas, three or four banks were being robbed every day, and in response, the Texas Bankers Association had offered a $5,000 reward to anyone shooting a bank robber during the crime. In addition, Ratliff knew that he would be immediately recognized if he returned to Cisco. This made the heist a particularly dangerous undertaking for the four men, so Ratliff decided to conceal his identity by disguising himself as Santa Claus. Such a disguise would also allay any suspicions by people in the bank. Stealing a car in Wichita Falls, they headed for Cisco and arrived on the morning of December 23.

As the group neared the bank, Ratliff donned a Santa Claus suit he had borrowed from Mrs. Midge Tellet, who ran the boarding house where they had been staying in Wichita Falls. They let Ratliff out several blocks from the bank. Ratliff, dressed as Santa, was smiling as he came along Avenue D (the main street), stopping to chat with eager children, answering their questions and patting them on the head. The main street of Cisco was crowded with people going about their daily activities. The town had the normal decorations for the season. Everyone was in the Christmas spirit, so no one thought it odd when Santa came walking down the street around noon, one day before Christmas Eve. Still followed by children attracted to "Santa," Ratliff joined the other three in an alley and led the way to the bank. Some of the happy children who had followed Santa continued into the bank after him.

Bank heist
Once inside, Ratliff received a pleasant greeting of "Hello, Santa," from the cashier. He did not respond, but walked to a desk in the middle of the lobby, where bank customers wrote out their deposit slips. A few customers were already at the teller's window making their deposits. The cashier again called out, "Hello, Santa." Again, no response.

Right about at this point, Ratliff's accomplice, Robert Hill, entered the bank, pointed a pistol at the cashier, and snarled, "Hands up!" The second bandit, Henry Helms, also entered brandishing a gun, followed by the third armed man, Davis.

Ratliff pushed through a swinging door, past the cashier's desk, went into the cashier's cage, opened a drawer under the counter, and removed a pistol from that location, stuffing it under his red Santa suit. Now, four men were armed, including "Santa Claus".

"Santa" ordered the assistant cashier to open the safe, and began stuffing money and bonds into a sack he had hidden beneath his costume.  While the others covered the customers and employees, Ratliff grabbed money from the tellers and forced one to open the vault.

Unseen by the four robbers, bank patron Mrs. B. P. Blassengame and her six-year-old daughter, Frances, entered the bank in hopes of seeing Santa, not knowing a robbery was in progress. Immediately realizing the danger, Mrs. Blassengame charged her way with her daughter through the bookkeeping office of the bank, announcing "They are robbing the bank," as she reached for the door to the alley.  She quickly unlocked the door, thrusting her daughter out into the alley while yelling at her to run and, despite warnings from the robbers that they would shoot, escaping herself.  She screamed for help as she ran the one block to city hall and the police department, alerting Chief of Police Bedford and most of the Cisco citizenry about the robbery.

According to eyewitness Boyce House, "Police Chief G.E. "Bit" Bedford [was] a giant of a man and a veteran peace officer."  Seizing a riot gun, he started for the scene and instructed officers R.T. Redies and George Carmichael to cover the back door of the bank. The chief posted himself at the alley, which ran alongside the bank and opened at the bank's front on Avenue D, while Officer Carmichael took a position near another alley which ran behind the bank and intersected the first.

Meanwhile, inside the bank, one of the men, with an automatic weapon in each hand, growled at the bookkeeper, "Don't look at me!" By this time, "Santa Claus" had filled his sack and exited the vault.

Shoot out
Who fired the first shot is uncertain.  Some sources state Ratliff, dressed as Santa, fired first, the bullet striking the bank's plate-glass window, possibly to signal unseen accomplices that the robbery had been accomplished.  Other sources say that Hill, seeing someone outside, fired a shot through the window, and a shot was returned, prompting Hill to fire several more shots into the ceiling to show that they were armed.

Immediately, Bedford and Carmichael directed cross-fire at the side door and the two-gunned robber fired back, first at Carmichael and then at Bedford.

A fusillade of gunfire began, as many civilians who owned guns were now outside the bank, and many more had rushed to hardware stores for pistols and rifles. The assistant postmaster and the postmaster were two of the civilians who took up arms against the robbers. They opened fire, and a rifle bullet struck one of the fugitives in the arm and "spun him around." A bullet also struck a cashier in the jaw, and another struck a bank customer in the leg. One customer made a run for it and was able to tell Bedford and Carmichael about the hostages. The robbers forced all of the people in the bank out the door and towards their blue sedan. Several of these hostages were wounded as they emerged into the alley, including Alex Spears, the bank president. Most of the customers escaped; however, the robbers kept as hostages two little girls, Laverne Comer (12) and Emma May Robertson (10). Using the girls as shields, the four made their way into the alley to their getaway car.

More than a hundred shots had already been fired before the shootout in the alley where the robbers returned to their getaway car.  In the alley, Chief Bedford and Deputy George Carmichael were mortally wounded; Officer Carmichael found himself reeling from a bullet that had been fired from one of the robbers' guns. Officer Redies, who had witnessed his partner being shot, went to him to assist in any way he could.  As Redies dodged the robbers' gunfire, the four made their way to the getaway car.  At the head of the alley, Police Chief Bedford stood in their way. In the exchange of fire, Chief Bedford, who had been a peace officer in the area for some 25 years, was shot five times.

Bedford died several hours later on Christmas Day, and Carmichael died almost a month later on January 17. Six other civilians were wounded. Davis was severely wounded in the shootout, while Ratliff suffered from two wounds, one in the chin and one in the leg.

Officer Redies ran to the police station and retrieved a rifle and began to pursue the robbers on foot. He was soon picked up and continued the pursuit with a civilian.

Getaway and manhunt
As the four robbers began their getaway, traveling south on Avenue D with their hostages, they realized that they were almost out of gas, having forgotten to fill the tank beforehand. As they neared the edge of town, pursued by the mob, one of their tires was flattened by a shot from law enforcement. The robbers lurched out of the vehicle, brandishing their guns to commandeer a passing Oldsmobile driven by 14-year-old Woodrow Wilson Harris, who relinquished the car.  The robbers transferred the loot, hostages, and injured comrade to the Oldsmobile, in the midst of gunfire. When they had finally transferred themselves to the new getaway car, only then did they realize that they could not start the car because Harris had cleverly taken the keys from the ignition when ordered to stop. Davis was by then unconscious, so they left him in the car and moved back to the first car with their two hostages. Robert Hill, the one who had followed Ratliff into the bank, was struck by a rifle bullet during the aborted transfer to Harris's car. They did not realize until later that they had left the money in the Oldsmobile with Davis.

The mob found Davis and the money and temporarily gave up the chase. The money was returned to the bank. They had stolen $12,400 in cash and $150,000 in nonnegotiable securities. Estimates were made that at least 200 bullet holes were made in the bank, a number which many thought too low. Besides the two police officers,  six townspeople had been wounded in the shootout, but no one was sure whether the robbers or the mob members were responsible. For Davis, who was a last-minute replacement for the group, this was the only crime in his lifetime. He was taken to a Ft. Worth hospital after his capture, but efforts to save his life failed. He died from bullet wounds he received in the gunbattle at the bank.

The trio had raced back out onto Avenue D, two of the "desperadoes" firing back at an automobile filled with pursuers. The driver swung east onto a dirt road and his companions began throwing out roofing nails in an effort to puncture the tires of the posse's machines. He then turned into a pasture, dashing through cactus, mesquite, and scrub oak. The growth became so heavy that further progress was impossible, and the robbers abandoned their bullet-riddled car and the two hostages several miles from town and continued on foot.

Sheriff John Hart and his deputies of Eastland, the county seat, had been called by long distance and given the news of the bank robbery; they piled into automobiles and sped to the spot where the bandits had abandoned the car. Reporters, including Boyce House, followed the action in another vehicle. By House's account, "officers and citizens poured in from all that section of the state and such a manhunt as Western Texas had never seen before was soon in progress .... Many members of the posse were on horseback or on foot as they beat their way through clumps of trees, searched high grass in the bottoms of ravines and peered around boulders in canyons."  One search party discovered an overcoat and bloodstained gloves. Later, citizens found a suitcase and a pile of bloodstained rags. In the suitcase were cotton and gauze, showing that the bandits had entered their enterprise with the knowledge that there might be shedding of blood.  Despite the search efforts, the bandits were able to evade search parties and steal another car the next morning.  The pursuit continued throughout Saturday and Saturday night. One of the results of the Yuletide crime was its tragic implications for little children in Eastland County. On Christmas Eve, a church in Eastland was filled and as jolly Saint Nicholas entered, a little boy called out, with a quaver in his voice: "Santa Claus, why did you rob that bank?"

When the bandits wrecked their car in Putnam, they then successfully commandeered a vehicle driven by Carl Wylie, a young driller, forcing him as their hostage to drive.  During the seizure, Mr. Wylie's father fired his shotgun after the fleeing car. The shot struck his son.

After hiding out all night with nothing to eat but oranges, which they did not offer to the injured young hostage, Helms, Hill, and Ratliff decided to return to Cisco to hide in plain sight. They released Wylie and his car and stole another. The wounded bandits, especially Ratliff, were doing very poorly due to their injuries, lack of food, and the icy, sleeting conditions.

The threesome was ambushed the next morning by Sheriff Foster in the little town of South Bend, in Young County.  As they tried to cross the Brazos River, officers spotted the single-seated machine with three occupants approaching. The driver caught sight of a gun in the hands of one of the officers and began backing rapidly down the road. Then, as the members of the posse scurried into their automobiles, the car whirled and rushed away. A car chase followed, with a shootout in an oil field as the three tried to escape, running toward the wells.

Involved in the firefight was Deputy Sheriff Cy Bradford, famous for bringing law and order into the coal fields of Strawn and neighboring towns and later as a Texas Ranger during the turbulent oil days.  His career was filled with gunfights in which Bradford's coolheadedness and marksmanship always brought him out the victor. Before Bradford's car had rolled to a stop, he was out with "Old Betsy", his double-barreled shotgun, an extra pair of shells in one hand. Bradford fired once and one of the fugitives fell. Bradford reloaded before firing again. "I did not want to be caught with an empty gun if they turned and made a stand," he explained afterward. The bandits ran on, firing back over their shoulders. Again Bradford shot, and a man went down, but arose and staggered on. The officer shoved the other shell into the gun and shot again, and the third desperado slumped to his knees, but got up and reeled on, disappearing among the derricks.  Ratliff was hit and fell to the ground while Helms and Hill, although wounded, escaped into the woods by the Brazos River, which offered ideal concealment. Ratliff was reportedly a "walking arsenal", bearing no fewer than six gunshot wounds and six pistols when captured, including the one he took from the bank. "Santa" had been caught.

Capture and convictions
The intense manhunt for Helms and Hill, directed by Ranger Captain Tom Hickman, pressed on so as not to allow the wounded men an opportunity for rest. Despite airplane assistance, the search team could not spot the fleeing men. In the process, two more men were wounded from accidental discharge of their weapons, bringing the total number of wounded to eight, excluding the three surviving robbers.  However, their trail was eventually picked up and the end of the chase evidently was not far because the footprints were close-spaced, showing that they were wearing from the long chase and weak from loss of blood. Marks showed that, to climb even a small rise, they had been forced to crawl. They were finally apprehended in Graham, Texas, on December 30, seven days after the bank robbery. They had been attempting to find the location of a rooming house in Graham, but the man from whom they asked directions noticed their pistols and notified the authorities. Presumably exhausted, the two were taken into custody without a fight. Hill was captured with three pistols, and Helms with four.

Though Helms, Hill, and Ratliff had several wounds apiece and had not eaten for days, all three survived and faced trials. Helms was second to stand trial after Ratliff.  He was identified as the one who had gunned down both lawmen and was given the death sentence in late February. After an unsuccessful insanity plea, he was executed by electric chair on September 6, 1929, in Huntsville, Texas. He is said to have had cabbage, sausage, tomatoes, coffee, and pie for his last meal. Hill was last to be tried. He pleaded guilty to armed robbery and took the stand on his own behalf, crying for mercy and citing his unhappy childhood.  In March, he was given a sentence of life imprisonment—99 years. He escaped from prison three times, but was recaptured each time. After settling down, he was paroled in the mid-1940s, reportedly changed his name, and became a productive citizen. Hill passed away in 1996.

Ratliff was convicted of armed robbery on January 27, 1928, and was also sentenced to 99 years in prison. Little 10-year-old Emma May Robinson's testimony  identified Ratliff as the man, disguised as Santa Claus, who had robbed the bank and kidnapped her. On the way to his cell, Ratliff muttered, "That's no hill for a high-stepper like me." Months later, on March 30, he was sentenced to execution for his role in the deaths of Bedford and Carmichael, although no one could testify to having seen Ratliff, dressed as Santa, fire a gun from the bank. Ratliff appealed his case, and when that failed, began behaving oddly in hopes of an insanity plea. He began acting insane the day of Helms's execution, much to the conviction of his jailers. His mother, Rilla Carter, filed for a lunacy hearing in Huntsville.

Lynching
The civilians of Eastland County grew infuriated to learn Ratliff had not already been executed for his deeds, and were further aggravated by this new development. Judge Davenport ordered Ratliff be extradited to Eastland County jail, writing a bench warrant for armed robbery of the Harris' Oldsmobile. On November 18, while awaiting execution there, Ratliff feigned paralysis, convincing his jailers, Pack Kilbourn and Tom A. "Uncle Tom" Jones, necessitating the two to feed and bathe him, and take him to the toilet. Having duped the two jailers, the man who had played Santa managed to get hold of a six-shooter in an office desk, fatally wounding Jones, and violently fighting the second jailer in hand-to-hand combat, sometimes shooting a few rounds that, fortunately for Kilbourn, missed their mark. Most of the town, including the fighting jailer's daughter, watched helplessly through the jail windows, unable to break open the steel door to help Kilbourn as he pinned Ratliff down, beat him into unconsciousness, then returned him to his cell.

A crowd began to gather the next morning, and by nightfall, had grown to nearly 2,000 all clamoring for Ratliff. Kilbourn refused their demand, but was overpowered by 15 to 20 men who rushed in and dragged Ratliff out.  They tied his hands and feet, carrying him to a vacant lot behind the local Majestic Theater on Mulberry Street, where the play The Noose was being presented. There, they threw a rope over a guy-wire between two telephone poles, on which they intended to hang him. The first attempt failed when the knot came loose and he fell to the ground. The second time, however, they used a stronger rope and were successful. His last words were, "Forgive me, boys," before he was hoisted 15 feet in the air.  He was pronounced dead 20 minutes later, at 9:55 pm on November 19. Some Eastland Countians have erected a marker and picket fence around a utility pole in back of the Majestic Theater on Mulberry Street, although this marker may or may not be the actual pole. Jones died that evening, bringing the total number of dead as a result of the Santa Claus Bank Robbery, including three bank robbers, to six.

No one was ever tried in association with the lynching, although a grand jury was formed. Several thousand persons viewed Ratliff's body the next day at a furniture store in Eastland before Judge Garrett ordered the corpse locked up. Ratliff's family took possession of the body and arranged for a funeral in Fort Worth, with burial at Olivet Cemetery. Many people in Cisco over the years have claimed to have been present at the robbery or related to someone who was, and it is now a part of local folklore. The greatest manhunt in the history of West Texas had ended, and the most celebrated of all the trials ever held in Eastland District Court's old courthouse, was also the last. At the end of this trial, the building was demolished. The First National Bank still stands in Cisco, although it is in a new building. It features a painting of the robbery, as well as a collection of newspaper clippings and pictures of those involved. In 1967, the Texas State Historical Survey Committee (now the Texas Historical Commission) placed a medallion on the bank commemorating the robbery.

References

External links
 House, Boyce, "The Santa Claus Bank Robbery," Startling Detective Adventures, (March 1930) pp. 14ff.
 

1927 crimes in the United States
Bank robberies
Robberies in the United States
Santa Claus
1927 in Texas
Crimes in Texas
December 1927 events
Christmas in the United States